ESOF Vendée La Roche (Etoile Sportive Ornaysienne de Football Vendée La Roche-sur-Yon) is a French women's football club founded in 1978 and is based in La Roche-sur-Yon, in the Vendée department of the Pays de la Loire.

The women's football department, created in 1978, took part in the multi-group French championship in the 1986–1987 and 1991–1992 seasons.

Following the creation of a single-group top league in 1992, ESOF La Roche first played it in the 1996–1997 season. This was the golden era of the team, and in the 1998–1999 and 2000–2001 seasons it was the championship's runner-up, being close to being the first team to represent France in the UEFA Women's Cup.

From the next season the team fell to mid to low positions and in the 2003–2004 season it was relegated. It has since played in the top tier in the 2005–2006, 2006–2007, 2007–2008, 2009–2010, 2010–2011 and 2015–2016 seasons. In all these appearances it struggled to avoid relegation and its best result was the 2006–2007's ninth position, while in the national cup it has reached the quarterfinals in three occasions, most recently in the 2011–2012 season.

Honours

Domestic
Division 2 Féminine
Winners (3): 1994-95, 2004-05, 2008-09,

2022–2023 squad

Source:

Former notable players
 Camille Abily
 Sonia Bompastor
 Alexandra Guiné
 Elodie Jacq
 Hoda Lattaf
 Melissa Plaza

References

External links
 Official website 
Official blog

La Roche-sur-Yon
Association football clubs established in 1978
1978 establishments in France
Division 1 Féminine clubs
Sport in Vendée
Football clubs in Pays de la Loire